Christ Church Cathedral is the Episcopal cathedral for the Diocese of Missouri.  It is located at 1210 Locust Street in St. Louis, Missouri.  The dean of the cathedral is the Very Reverend Kathie Adams-Shepherd. Adams-Shepherd is also the first female dean of this cathedral. Built during 1859–67, it is one of the few well-preserved surviving works of Leopold Eidlitz, a leading mid-19th-century American architect, and was designated a national historic landmark in 1994 for its architecture.

History and description
The cathedral was built between 1859 and 1867, and designed by architect Leopold Eidlitz. The Gothic Revival structure was an expression of the city's sense of its significance as the United States expanded westwards.  It was one of the earliest churches influenced by the revival within the Episcopal Church of early Christian practices and styles, which later was influenced by the Oxford Movement originating in England. It was designated a National Historic Landmark in 1994.

The cathedral is located in what is now downtown St. Louis, at the southeast corner of Thirteenth and Locust Streets.  The main body of the church was built of Illinois sandstone, and its roof is of purple and green slate.  It is basically a cruciform structure, with a tower projecting from the northern facade at the northwest corner.  The base of the tower houses a baptistry, with a font of Italian marble.

A smaller sandstone chapel dates to 1893–95. From 1910 to 1912, a tower and porch were added of Indiana limestone. The chime of three steel bells, dedicated in 1912, were cast by the Bochumer Verein Foundry in 1904. The bourdon bell, weighing 5,732 pounds, is the largest bell in Missouri. The cathedral originally housed an organ from the Roosevelt Organ Company; in 1926 the Skinner Organ Company installed a new organ.

Montana silver magnate Charles D. McLure, a St. Louis native, was revealed to be the anonymous donor of $50,000 toward constructing the cathedral (approximately $6.5 million today).

See also
List of the Episcopal cathedrals of the United States
List of cathedrals in the United States
List of National Historic Landmarks in Missouri
National Register of Historic Places listings in Downtown and Downtown West St. Louis

References

External links

National Historic Landmarks in Missouri
Churches in St. Louis
Episcopal cathedrals in Missouri
Episcopal church buildings in Missouri
Churches completed in 1867
19th-century Episcopal church buildings
Landmarks of St. Louis
Historic American Buildings Survey in Missouri
National Register of Historic Places in St. Louis
Downtown West, St. Louis
1867 establishments in Missouri
Tourist attractions in St. Louis
Buildings and structures in St. Louis